The narrow-tailed four-clawed gecko or narrowhead dtella (Gehyra angusticaudata) is a species of gecko. It is endemic to eastern Thailand.

References

Angusticaudata
Geckos of Thailand
Endemic fauna of Thailand
Reptiles described in 1963
Taxa named by Edward Harrison Taylor